Woodstock High School may refer to:
Woodstock High School (Georgia), in Woodstock, Georgia
Woodstock High School (Illinois), in Woodstock, Illinois
Woodstock High School (New Brunswick) Woodstock, New Brunswick

See also 
 Woodstock North High School, Woodstock, Illinois
 Woodstock Union High School, Woodstock, Vermont